Vinagarra findolabium is a species of ray-finned fish in the genus Vinagarra.

References 

Vinagarra
Fish described in 2008
Taxa named by Li Feng-Lian
Taxa named by Zhou Wei (zoologist)
Taxa named by Fu Qiang